The Moundsville Bridge is a four-lane through arch bridge that connects Mead Township, Ohio and Moundsville, West Virginia across the Ohio River. The approach routes to the bridge carries Ohio State Route 872 (SR 872) on the Ohio side and the unsigned West Virginia Route 2 Spur on the West Virginia side. The bridge is also officially known as the Arch A. Moore Bridge, named after the former West Virginia governor Arch A. Moore, Jr.

Description
The western approach to the bridge begins at a diamond interchange with Ohio State Route 7 in rural Mead Township, Belmont County, Ohio. North of the interchange, Township Road 533 but towards the bridge, the four-lane, divided SR 872 begins. The road curves to the east and has intersections with access roads (TR 533) to the former R.E. Burger Power Station. First, SR 872 passes over TR 533 and railroad lines before beginning the Moundsville Bridge itself. Near the north bank of the river, the bridge crosses the state line where SR 872 ends and WV 2 Spur begins. After passing the main span, the road begins descending into Moundsville passing over local streets and a railroad. WV 2 Spur ends at a signalized intersection with WV 2 (Lafayette Avenue) and 12th Street in the central business district of Moundsville.

History
The Dilles Bottom section of Mead Township and Moundsville had been connected by a toll ferry since 1951. Upon the completion of the bridge, the ferry was retired.

Planning for the bridge has been ongoing since the late 1970s. Plans for the bridge began during the end of Arch Moore's term as governor but went into limbo due to a state moratorium on building projects at the time. Construction resumed on the bridge upon the announcement of shared funding from West Virginia, Ohio, and the federal government in 1977 by then-Governor Jay Rockefeller; construction was expected to be completed in 1980. By 1979, the Ohio access route was built but the bridge itself was not opened until August 15, 1986.

The opening of the Vietnam Veterans Memorial Bridge, along with the Moundsville Bridge was thought to have reduced the amount of traffic, and thus tolls collected by the nearby Bellaire Bridge were reduced by 50 per-cent in 1987.

Cultural references
In the 2011 independent film Margin Call, a character played by Stanley Tucci boasts of designing a bridge between Moundsville and Dilles Bottom, Ohio in 1986.

See also
List of crossings of the Ohio River

References

External links

 Moundsville Bridge at Bridges & Tunnels
 Bridge Hunter

Road bridges in West Virginia
Bridges in Belmont County, Ohio
Buildings and structures in Marshall County, West Virginia
Bridges over the Ohio River
Through arch bridges in the United States
Transportation in Marshall County, West Virginia
Road bridges in Ohio
State highways in the United States shorter than one mile
Moundsville, West Virginia